Neighbours is an Australian television soap opera created by Reg Watson. It was first broadcast on 18 March 1985. The following is a list of characters that first appeared in the serial in 1998, by order of first appearance. All characters were introduced by the show's executive producer Stanley Walsh. The 14th season of Neighbours began airing from 19 January 1998. Sally Upton was introduced during the following month. March saw the arrivals of Nicholas Atkins and Drew Kirk, while Joel Samuels and Veronica Olenski made their debuts in May. Karen Oldman and Mike Healey began appearing from August. Tad Reeves and Geri Hallett were both introduced during November.

Sally Upton

Sally Upton, played by Sally Davis, made her first screen appearance on 23 February 1998. Three weeks prior to playing Sally, Davis made a guest appearance in the show as Alison Nova. Shortly after Sally's introduction, she became a love interest for Joel Samuels (Daniel MacPherson). The couple were initially not "on the same wavelength", but they became closer when Sally confided in Joel about her mother's death. Sally was "opinionated" and "quite pushy". Her green Volkswagen Beetle car was later owned by Libby Kennedy (Kym Valentine), Sally's one time love rival.

Sally works as an assistant at the Erinsborough University radio station UniFM, alongside Toadfish Rebecchi (Ryan Moloney). Toadie introduces Sally to his housemate Joel Samuels and she is instantly attracted to him. Joel initially finds Sally hard to work out, but they soon begin dating. Sally opens up to Joel about the death of her mother and they become closer, but when Sally notices the closeness between Joel and Libby Kennedy, she becomes jealous and suspects Joel has feelings for Libby. Sally and Joel also fall out over Libby and Sarah Beaumont (Nicola Charles), as Sally had made friends with Sarah and did not understand the bad feelings between Sarah and Libby's family. Sally has difficulty dealing with the anniversary of her mother's death and her heightened emotions cause her to reject Joel's attempts at sympathy. She then accuses Joel of cheating on her and ends their relationship.

Weeks later, Sally runs into Drew Kirk (Dan Paris) at the local pub and they decide to go and see a movie together. While Drew goes to change, Sally waits downstairs for him. However, she then bursts into his room and tries to kiss him. Drew rejects her as he is friends with Joel. After Joel ends up in the hospital, things between Sally and Drew become awkward, especially as Joel believes Sally still has feelings for him. Sally plays along, as she is worried that rejecting Joel might affect his recovery. When she begins to struggle with the charade, Sally tells Joel that she cannot see him anymore and leaves.

A writer for the BBC's official Neighbours website said Sally's most notable moment was "rushing in on Drew when he was changing and attempting to kiss him."

Nicholas Atkins

Nicholas "Nick" Atkins, played by Jason Crewes, made his first screen appearance on 12 March 1998. The character was the third member of the Atkins family to be introduced. He immediately causes upset when he "comes down heavy" on his young sister Caitlin Atkins (Emily Milburn), after catching her with her boyfriend. One of Nick's first storylines saw him pretend to be Toadfish Rebecchi (Ryan Moloney). Another notable storyline saw him accused of assault. When the charges were dropped, it left Nick "feeling bitter about the experience" and wondering whether he should accept more work at Erinsborough High. Nick and Caitlin departed Neighbours at the same time to return to Adelaide. The siblings have "a cheeky farewell" after Caitlin paints a goodbye message on the road to make sure the residents did not forget them in a hurry. Tony Johnston, author of Neighbours: 20 years of Ramsay Street, branded Nicholas "handsome". While Stephen Murphy from Inside Soap thought Nick and his sister "made a big impact in Erinsborough".

Nick arrives in Erinsborough to look after his younger sister, Caitlin. He arrives just as Caitlin tries to run away with her boyfriend, Josh Hughes (Sullivan Stapleton). Nick argues with his brother Ben (Brett Cousins) over Caitlin, as they both feel that they can care for her better than the other. Karen Oldman (Pia Miranda), a fan of  Toadie's, comes over and mistakes Nick for Toadie. As Toadie is worried that Karen will be disappointed to see the real him, he convinces Nick to pretend to be him for a while longer. Nick is uncomfortable with the deception, but goes along with it. He is relieved when Toadie later reveals himself to Karen. Nick finds himself in charge of Caitlin when Ben moves away. He gets himself a job teaching at Erinsborough High and settles into the neighbourhood.

Nick befriends his colleague Jacquie Boyd (Amy Lapin), which upsets Caitlin, as she dislikes her. When student Mickey Dalton (Trent Fowler) falls out with Paul McClain (Jansen Spencer), a fight breaks out between them and Nick tries to break it up. Mickey takes a fall and hurts his ankle, leading his mother, Jean (Joanne Canning) to sue Nick for assaulting her son. Nick is then suspended from the school. After his name is cleared, Nick is allowed to return to the school, but he admits that he is not sure he wants to continue teaching. When Nick and Caitlin's mother returns from the Middle East, Nick tells his sister that they are going home to Adelaide. Despite Caitlin's protests, they leave Erinsborough.

Drew Kirk

Drew Kirk, played by Dan Paris, made his first screen appearance on 27 March 1998. Neighbours was the first television show Paris auditioned for. He won the role of Drew straight away. He was contracted until March 2002. Drew is a country boy who previously worked on a farm in Oakey, before coming to Erinsborough. Drew replaced Ben Atkins (Brett Cousins) at Carpenter Mechanics. James Joyce of the Newcastle Herald said Drew was a "suitably spunky rival" for Ben. Denise Everton from the Illawarra Mercury thought Drew was "nice, naive and gorgeous." Drew was known for his long hair, which gave him a "hippy look". Paris was banned from cutting his hair by the producers.

Joel Samuels

Joel Samuels, played by Daniel MacPherson, made his first screen appearance on 13 May 1998. MacPherson auditioned for the show's casting director, Jan Russ, who then approached the producers and suggested they create the role of Joel for him. MacPherson joined the cast when he was seventeen. He relocated to Melbourne from Sydney for filming. Annette Dasey from Inside Soap said Joel was "good-looking, down-to-earth, friendly and a champion triathlete." She also branded him a "heart-throb", but MacPherson said Joel was unlucky in love, mostly due to his naivety. For his portrayal of Joel, MacPherson received a nomination for Most Popular New Male Talent at the 1999 Logie Awards.

Veronica Olenski

Veronica Olenski, played by Caroline Lloyd, made her first screen appearance on 18 May 1998. Lloyd appeared in the semi-regular role of Dr. Olenski for eleven years. A notable storyline for Veronica saw the introduction of her husband Greg Michaels (Nick Farnell) and his subsequent affair with Veronica's patient Stephanie Scully (Carla Bonner). Greg told Steph that he and Veronica had separated, despite the fact that they still lived together. Greg admitted that he cared for Veronica, but no longer loved her. When Steph attended a charity meeting, she received "short shrift" from Veronica who was the charity's chairwoman. Steph's young son was later injured in an accident and Veronica had to put her feelings aside to treat him.

Dr. Veronica Olenski works as a doctor and gynaecologist at Erinsborough Hospital. Her first patient is competitive swimmer Caitlin Atkins (Emily Milburn), who she treats for exhaustion. A few months later, Dr. Olenski informs Joel Samuels (Daniel MacPherson) that he has damaged the ligaments in his knee, and it is unlikely that he will ever be able to compete in triathlons again. Dr. Olenski treats Craig "Pinhead" Pinders (Nathan Godkin), Libby Kennedy (Kym Valentine) and Brendan Bell (Blair Venn) when they involved in road accidents. The following year, Dr. Olenski helps to deliver Libby's son and saves her life when she goes into cardiac arrest. Dr. Olenski also helps to deliver Oscar Scully (Ingo Dammer-Smith), Ashley Thomas (Amielle Lemaire) and Charlie Hoyland (Aaron Aulsebrook-Walker). That same year, Dr. Olenski becomes responsible for the care of Izzy Hoyland (Natalie Bassingthwaighte). Dr. Olenski accidentally gives away Izzy's pregnancy secret when she leaves a message on the Hoyland house phone about an ultrasound appointment.

Dr. Olenski is forced to deliver Sky Mangel's (Stephanie McIntosh) baby during a fire at the hospital, due to Sky's advanced labour. Once the baby is born, Dr. Olenski moves them to another part of the hospital. Six months later, Dr. Olenski treats Pepper Steiger (Nicky Whelan) for stage 2 cervical dysplasia and incorrectly diagnosis Susan Kennedy (Jackie Woodburne) with the menopause, when she is really suffering from Multiple sclerosis. When Carmella Cammeniti suffers pains during her pregnancy, she is rushed to hospital where Dr. Olenski performs an ultrasound and assures Carmella that there is nothing to be alarmed about. Carmella later goes into premature labour and Dr. Olenski delivers her daughter by caesarean section. During Rosetta Cammeniti (Natalie Saleeba) and Frazer Yeats's (Ben Lawson) first ultrasound, Dr. Olenski cannot find their baby's heartbeat and believes that Rosie has experienced a false pregnancy. Frazer later asks Dr. Olenski if there is a chance that Rosie could still be pregnant, and she offers to perform another ultrasound. Dr. Olenski finds a heartbeat and tells Rosie and Frazer that they are expecting a baby after all.

When Dr. Olenski runs into Stephanie Scully at the hospital, she admits that she is having a tough day as her husband, Greg, has left her for another woman. Steph then admits that she is the other woman and Veronica slaps her. They exchange heated words at a breast cancer charity meeting, of which Veronica is the chairperson. When Charlie is injured, Veronica is forced to treat him and she calls a truce with Steph. However, she is upset when she later sees Steph hugging Greg and freezes her joint bank account. Steph tells Veronica that she is being unfair, but Veronica refuses to listen. Veronica lashes out at Steph and they get into a physical fight. Veronica later apologises and asks Greg for another chance, but he turns her down. When Susan plans to act as a surrogate for her daughter, Dr. Olenski warns her that the physical strain could cause a serious relapse of her MS. The local newspaper soon gets hold of the story and Dr. Olenski tells Susan's husband, Karl (Alan Fletcher), that the hospital are not happy with the media attention. She also offers to fight the hospital's CEO over his opposition to IVF. Not long after, Dr. Olenski carries out the IVF procedure on Susan and treats a newborn India Napier (Alia and Gabriella De Vercelli).

Karen Oldman

Karen Oldman, played by Pia Miranda, made her first screen appearance on 13 August 1998. Neighbours marked Miranda's first television role, three years after she graduated from drama school. She admitted that her first day on set was embarrassing, as a tampon fell out of her bag and into her co-star Todd MacDonald's (Darren Stark) lap during their first meeting. Miranda found Neighbours to be a good training ground for her acting skills, saying "It's fantastic training because I never forget my lines. After being on Neighbours you are so used to getting reels and reels of script, and you are used to working under heaps of pressure." Karen was Toadfish Rebecchi's (Ryan Moloney) "first big romance", so he was devastated when he discovered she was having an affair.

Karen is a first year student at Eden Hills University. She listens to Toadfish Rebecchi's radio show on UniFM and mistakes Nick Atkins (Jason Crewes) for Toadie. As Toadie is too shy to meet Karen, he and Nick stage a ruse that Nick is Toadie and Nick dates Karen for a while. Eventually, the truth is revealed and Karen is angry with both guys, but decides to give things a go with Toadie.

During a meal with Toadie's housemate Sarah Beaumont (Nicola Charles), Karen finds herself attracted to Sarah's boyfriend Alex Fenton (Guy Hooper) and they leave together when Toadie and Sarah start bickering. When confronted, Karen and Alex admit that they have been seeing each other and their respective relationships end. However, Karen returns several weeks later and she and Toadie reconcile. Toadie suggests Karen pilot his and Lou Carpenter's (Tom Oliver) flying machine in order to win money to go away to Bali, but she refuses after a mishap involving a helium doll version of her floating away. Karen does test a newer flying machine, but is unsuccessful in winning the money. Karen tells Toadie she is moving to New Zealand with her family. They agree to try to keep things going long distance, but Karen ends the relationship during a phone call several months later, breaking Toadie's heart.

Mike Healey

Mike Healey, played by Andrew Blackman, made his first screen appearance on 17 August 1998. Mike was introduced as a love interest for Libby Kennedy (Kym Valentine). Mike faced disapproval from Libby's family, as he was her university lecturer and several years older than her. The couple faced further problems when Libby learned Mike regularly spent social time with his estranged wife. Valentine commented "She understands Mike and his wife have to keep in touch as they have a child together, but she can't help but fear the worst." Valentine added that as the relationship continued, there would be "a lot of drama" as they were confronted with further crises.

While lecturing at Eden Hills University, Mike is attracted to his student Libby Kennedy and they begin dating. The couple decide to keep their relationship a secret, due to their age difference and the problems Mike could encounter at the university. When Libby lies that she is horse-riding, and is reported missing from the group, she is forced to come clean about her relationship with Mike. Her family hold a dinner party in order to meet Mike. Libby's father Karl (Alan Fletcher) is not pleased that Mike is dating his daughter, especially when he learns that Mike has a young daughter of his own. Mike introduces Libby to his daughter, Sasha (Chelsea Driessen), which causes her to have second thoughts about their relationship. Mike reassures Libby that he does not have feelings for his ex-wife, Victoria (Tamar Kelly), but Libby is uneasy when she learns Mike still socialises with Victoria. To prove his love for Libby, Mike rents Number 32 and they become closer.

While Libby is at Mike's house, his mother Bianca (Joy Mitchell) calls by and tells Libby that she cannot replace Victoria. When Mike learns what Bianca said, he tells Libby that he has spoken to his mother and assures her there is no problem. However, it soon emerges that Mike only said that to placate Libby and Bianca had not changed her opinion. Libby manages to bond with Sasha, but Mike's behaviour towards Libby starts to change. Drew Kirk (Dan Paris) catches Mike cheating on Libby with Victoria. Drew  confronts Mike and punches him. Drew does not tell Libby, as he does not want to upset her, and she continues to date Mike. Libby then told Mike he needed to formally divorce Victoria if they were to resume their relationship, which was initially accepted by both him and Victoria. When Sasha tells Libby that Victoria is expecting another baby, Libby realises that Mike has been cheating on her and she ends their relationship. Mike tries to win her back, but she refuses, knowing she will always come second in his life. Mike then moves out of Number 32.

A writer for the BBC's Neighbours website believed Mike's most notable moment was "getting his ex-wife pregnant whilst he was seeing Libby." A columnist for Inside Soap quipped, "Mike is just the latest in a long line of rotters who caused Libby heartache over the years."

Tad Reeves

Wayne "Tad" Reeves, played by Jonathon Dutton, made his first screen appearance on 16 November 1998. Producers began casting for the role of Tadpole, Toadfish Rebecchi's (Ryan Moloney) younger cousin, as they needed a new "rascal" character because Toadie had grown up. Dutton had previously appeared in Neighbours in a small guest role, before he won the role of Tad. Dutton was sixteen when he joined the show and he had a tutor on set, so he could keep up with his schooling. Denise Everton from the Illawarra Mercury thought Tad was "outgoing". Dutton admitted to her that one of his hardest storylines to film was when Tad learned that he was adopted.

Geri Hallett

Geri Hallett, played by Isabella Dunwill, made her first screen appearance on 25 November 1998. Dunwill was initially contracted for two weeks, but after the producers liked her performance and character, they kept bringing her back. Dunwill commented "I'm thrilled. She's fun to play." The actress also admitted that she wanted her recurring role to become more permanent.

Describing her character, Dunwill said "She's a troublemaker, she's manipulative, and she'll stop at nothing to get what she wants." Geri caused friction between couple Drew Kirk (Dan Paris) and Libby Kennedy (Kym Valentine). She developed a grudge against Libby because she won Drew's affections and Geri was jealous. Geri got a job working at the Erinsborough News, alongside Libby, and she started dating Libby's boss and got a byline on her first story, something that took Libby two years to get. Dunwill found the scenes between Geri and Libby "a lot of fun" to film and added that people had told her they enjoyed watching her "nasty" character.

Geri attends Eden Hills University and shares the same journalism course with Libby Kennedy. The two girls frequently clash. Matters are not helped when Geri begins dating Drew Kirk, who Libby previously rejected after he declared his feelings for her. Geri confronts Drew about his feelings for her and when he cannot give her a straight answer, she realises he still loves Libby and the relationship ends. Geri becomes Toadfish Rebecchi's (Ryan Moloney) co-host at UniFM and he plots to have her fired, as he dislikes her. Toadie discovers Geri is being paid to appear on the volunteer radio station, and while investigating further, he learns that Geri is receiving bribes in exchange for promoting local businesses. Toadie tells Libby, who publishes the story in a magazine, resulting in Geri being sacked. Geri causes more trouble when she spreads rumours about Drew seeing Libby's friend Stephanie Scully (Carla Bonner) after noticing Steph's attraction towards Drew. However Libby and Steph set up Geri to expose her muckraking: - Steph deliberately gave the impression of affection to Drew while Geri was watching, with Geri gossiping to Libby as predicted. Libby and Steph found this amusing, though Drew was annoyed at being involved in the setup. She increases Libby's ire by publishing Libby's rejection of Drew's marriage proposal in her Erinsborough News column, but Libby retaliates by exposing Geri's practice of accepting bribes from local businesses in return for free plugs on her UniFM radio show. Following Libby and Drew's wedding, they run into Geri on the Gold Coast during their honeymoon. Geri takes photos of them for the paper and continues to seemingly follow them around all day.

Others

References

External links
Characters and cast at the Official AU Neighbours website
Characters and cast at the Official UK Neighbours website
Characters and cast at the Internet Movie Database

1998
, Neighbours